Darren Treacy (born 26 June 1971) is an Australian former professional rugby league footballer who played in the 1990s and 2000s. He played for the Newcastle Knights, St. George Dragons, St. George Illawarra Dragons and the Parramatta Eels.

Playing career
Treacy made his first grade debut for Newcastle against South Sydney in Round 1 1994.  In 1995, Treacy played in the club's finals series as they reached the preliminary final before being defeated by Manly-Warringah.

In 1997, Treacy joined St George and in 1998 played in the club's final ever game as a stand-alone entity which was a 20–12 loss to Canterbury in the 1998 finals series.

In 1999, St George announced a joint venture with Illawarra to form St George Illawarra.  Treacy played in the club inaugural game against Parramatta.  Treacy then played for the club at second-row forward in their 1999 NRL Grand Final loss to the Melbourne Storm. Treacy then had a spell in England with the Salford City Reds in 2002.

In 2003, Treacy returned to Australia and played 1 season with Parramatta before retiring at the end of the season.

References

External links

1971 births
Living people
Australian rugby league players
Country New South Wales Origin rugby league team players
Newcastle Knights players
St. George Dragons players
St. George Illawarra Dragons players
Salford Red Devils players
Parramatta Eels players
Rugby league players from Newcastle, New South Wales
Rugby league second-rows